The Princes' House in Plön in the North German state of Schleswig-Holstein is a former royal summer residence in the grounds of the park at Plön Castle. It is the only surviving maison de plaisance in Schleswig-Holstein. 

It was given its present name because at the end of the 19th and beginning of the 20th century it was used as a residence and school for the sons of the German emperor, William II. At that time it was enlarged with two extensions. A farm on nearby Princes' Island served the princes as a learning site for agricultural skills.

Sources 
 Deutsche Stiftung Denkmalschutz (Hg.in): Kulturerbe bewahren. Förderprojekte der Deutschen Stiftung Denkmalschutz. Bd. 3: Schlösser, Burgen, Parks. Monumente, Bonn 2004, S. 202–211.
 Dehio: Handbuch der Deutschen Kunstdenkmäler Hamburg, Schleswig-Holstein. Deutscher Kunstverlag, München 1994, 
 J. Habich, D. Lafrenz, H. Schulze, L. Wilde: Schlösser und Gutsanlagen in Schleswig-Holstein. L&H Verlag, Hamburg 1998,

External links 

Prinzenhaus, Plön
Friends of the Plön Prinzenhaus 
Insights of Plön with historic postcards of the Prinzenhaus 
More details and photographs at www.monumente-online.de 

Castles in Schleswig-Holstein
Buildings and structures in Plön (district)